Oktyabrskoye is an airbase in Crimea used by the Russian Air Force located   east of Hvardiiske, Simferopol Raion, Crimea.

In 1958, the 639th Fighter Aviation Regiment of the 49th Fighter Aviation Division, Black Sea Fleet, was redeployed to the Oktyabrskoye airfield from Khersones. The regiment was armed with Mikoyan-Gurevich MiG-17 (ASCC "Fresco") fighters. On April 6, 1960, by a directive of the USSR Ministry of Defense dated March 16, 1960, as part of the "further significant reduction in the Armed Forces of the USSR," the headquarters of the 49th Fighter Aviation Division at the Belbek airfield was disbanded. At the same time, the regiment was disbanded. 

The base was previously home to the 943rd Konstantskiy Red Banner Maritime Missile Aviation Regiment of the Black Sea Fleet.

The base was previously used by the Ukrainian Air Force before it was abandoned, it was restored during 2020 to serve as a reserve base. During February 2022 military units were observed using the southern portion of the base.

References

Russian Air Force bases
Military facilities in Crimea
Airports in Crimea
Installations of the Russian Navy
Ukrainian airbases